The Great Bend Boom were a professional baseball team based in Great Bend, Kansas that played only during the 2016 season. The Boom played in the Pecos League, an independent baseball league which is not affiliated with Major or Minor League Baseball.

External links
Great Bend Boom home page

Pecos League teams
Professional baseball teams in Kansas
2016 establishments in Kansas
2016 disestablishments in Kansas
Baseball teams established in 2016
Baseball teams disestablished in 2016
Defunct independent baseball league teams
Defunct baseball teams in Kansas
Barton County, Kansas